The 1975 Masters (officially the 1975 Benson & Hedges Masters) was the first of the non-ranking snooker tournament at which many of the World's top players competed. It was held from Monday 13 to Friday 17 January 1975 at the West Centre Hotel in London. Ten players were invited for the event.

John Spencer won the inaugural event by defeating Ray Reardon 9–8 on the re-spotted black in the final frame. The highest break of the tournament was 92 made by Spencer in the first frame of the final.

Prize fund
The breakdown of prize money:
Winner: £2,000
Runner-up: £1,000
Semi-final: £500
Quarter-final: £250
Last 10: £100
Highest break: £92
Total: £5,292

Main draw

Final

Century breaks
There were no century breaks made during the tournament. The highest break was a 92 by John Spencer.

References 

Masters (snooker)
Masters
Masters (snooker)
Masters (snooker)
Masters